John O'Sullivan may refer to:

Sports
John O'Sullivan (cricketer) (1918–1991), New Zealand cricketer
John O'Sullivan (cyclist) (born 1933), Australian cyclist
John O'Sullivan (footballer) (born 1993), Irish footballer for Accrington Stanley
John O'Sullivan (rugby league) (1950–2018), New Zealand rugby league footballer
John O'Sullivan (rugby union) (born 1980), Irish rugby union footballer
John Lack O'Sullivan (1976–2002), Gaelic footballer and Australian rules footballer

Politics and government
John O'Sullivan (Cork politician) (1901–1990), Irish Fine Gael Party politician, Senator, later TD for Cork South-West
John O'Sullivan (Illinois politician), member of the Illinois House of Representatives
John C. O'Sullivan (1841–?), politician in Ontario, Canada
John M. O'Sullivan (1881–1948), Irish Cumann na nGaedhael/Fine Gael politician, TD, cabinet minister and academic

Other
John O'Sullivan (columnist) (born 1942), British conservative columnist and editor
John O'Sullivan (engineer), Australian astronomer and electrical engineer, and one of the inventors of Wi-Fi
Sir John O'Sullivan (soldier) (1700–1760), Irish soldier, Quartermaster general to Prince Charles Edward Stewart during the Jacobite Rising of 1745
John Francis O'Sullivan (1850–1907), Irish-American awarded the Medal of Honor during the Indian Wars
John L. O'Sullivan (1813–1895), journalist who popularized the phrase "Manifest Destiny"

See also 
John Sullivan (disambiguation)